The I Marine Amphibious Corps, or I MAC, was a formation of the United States Marine Corps.
It was created on 1 October 1942, with most of the staff transferred from Amphibious Corps, Pacific Fleet (ACPF). It was then deployed to the South Pacific Areaa U.S.-led multinational military command active during World War II that was a part of the U.S. Pacific Ocean Areasfirst to Hawaii, then to New Caledonia.

History

When the Marine Corps was not satisfied with the leadership of its commander, Major General Clayton B. Vogel, Commandant Thomas Holcomb ordered Alexander Vandegrift to take command. Vandegrift, the commander of the 1st Marine Division during the Battle of Guadalcanal was promoted to lieutenant general.

General Vandegrift carried on in command of the Corps when its next-designated commander for the invasion of Bougainville, Major General Charles D. Barrett, died following a fall from the balcony of his quarters in New Caledonia. General Vandegrift led I MAC during the invasion and was later made the Commandant.

The Corps consisted of the 3rd Marine Division, the 37th Infantry Division (United States), the 8th Brigade (New Zealand) and the 53rd Naval Construction Battalion (Seabees). It conducted the invasion of Bougainville.  When the 53rd was assigned to the Marine Corps it was redesignated "Naval Construction Battalion First Marine Amphibious Corps"

On 15 April 1944, I MAC was renamed the III Amphibious Corps.

Command structure

Commanding generals
Major General Clayton B. Vogel: 1 October 1942 – July 1943
Major General Alexander Vandegrift: July 1943 – 27 September 1943
Major General Charles D. Barrett: 27 September 1943 – 8 October 1943
Major General Alexander Vandegrift: 8 October 1943 – 1 November 1943
Major General Roy S. Geiger: 9 November 1943 – 30 June 1945 (as III Amphibious Corps)
Major General Keller E. Rockey: 30 June 1945 – 10 June 1946

Chiefs of Staff

Brigadier general Archie F. Howard: 1 October 1942 – July 1943
Colonel Gerald C. Thomas: July 1943 – 9 November 1943
Brigadier general Alfred H. Noble: 10 November 1943 – 17 December 1943
Brigadier general Oscar R. Cauldwell: 18 December 1943 – January 1944
Brigadier general Merwin H. Silverthorn: January 1944–30 June 1945
Brigadier general William A. Worton: 30 June 1945 – 10 June 1946

Corps Artillery commanders

Brigadier general Pedro del Valle: April 1944 – October 1944
Brigadier general David R. Nimmer

Personnel Officer (C-1)

Lieutenant Colonel Joseph C. Burger: October 1942 – November 1943
Colonel William J. Scheyer: November 1943 – September 1944
Colonel Gale T. Cummings

Intelligence Officer (C-2)

Lieutenant Colonel William F. Coleman
Lieutenant Colonel Sidney S. Wade

Operations Officer (C-3)

Lieutenant Colonel Merrill B. Twining
Lieutenant Colonel Edward W. Snedeker: September 1943 – December 1943
Colonel Walter A. Wachtler: December 1943 – July 1945

Logistics Officer (C-4)

Colonel Leonard E. Rea
Lieutenant Colonel Frederick L. Wieseman: August 1943 – August 1944
Colonel Francis B. Loomis Jr.: August 1944 – July 1945
Colonel Earl S. Piper: July 1945 – July 1946

Plans Officer (C-5)

Colonel Dudley S. Brown: October 1942 – July 1943
Colonel Elmer H. Salzman
Colonel Benjamin W. Gally: July 1945 – 24 June 1946

Insignia
The Corps' insignia was a shield with a blue field emblazoned by the Southern cross constellation in white and a square red diamond outlined with a white border, center. Various elements of the Corps used this basic design with their task insignia in white on the red center.
 plain red diamond – Corps Headquarters
 Anti-aircraft cannon – Defense battalion
 Balloon – Barrage Balloon Battalion
 Crossed cannons – Artillery 
 Parachute – Paratroops
 Skull – Raider battalions
 Star – Supply and Service
 Winged Engineer Castle – Aviation Engineers
 The 1st Marine Division adopted the basic design with the number One emblazoned with the word Guadalcanal.
 23 – Later the 23rd Marines adopted the basic design without white outlining the diamond.

See also

 List of corps of the United States
 1st Marine Division
 23rd Marine Regiment
 Marine Raiders

Notes

1942 establishments in the United States
Corps of the United States Marine Corps
Military units and formations established in 1942
Military units and formations of the United States Marine Corps in World War II